Terval is a commune in the Vendée department in the Pays de la Loire region in western France. It was established as a commune nouvelle on 1 January 2023 from the merger of the communes of La Tardière, Breuil-Barret and La Chapelle-aux-Lys.

See also
Communes of the Vendée department

References

Communes of Vendée